

Wilfrith or Wilferth was a medieval Bishop of Worcester. He was consecrated between 915 and 922. He died in 928 or 929. The last charter he attested was dated 16 April 928.

Citations

References

External links
 

Bishops of Worcester
10th-century English bishops